A total lunar eclipse will take place on July 7, 2047. It will last 1 hour 40 minutes and 49 seconds and will plunge the full Moon into deep darkness, as it passes right through the centre of the Earth's umbral shadow. While the visual effect of a total eclipse is variable, the Moon may be stained a deep orange or red colour at maximum eclipse. This will be a great spectacle for everyone who sees it. The partial eclipse will last for 3 hours and 39 minutes in total.

The moon will pass through the center of the Earth's shadow. Totality will last 100 minutes 49 seconds, the second longest for this Saros series.

Visibility
It will be completely visible over most of the Pacific Ocean, seen rising over Australia and Eastern Asia, and setting over North and South America.

Related lunar eclipses

Lunar year series

Saros series

Half-Saros cycle
A lunar eclipse will be preceded and followed by solar eclipses by 9 years and 5.5 days (a half saros). This lunar eclipse is related to two annular solar eclipses of Solar Saros 137.

See also
List of lunar eclipses
List of 21st-century lunar eclipses

Notes

External links

2047-07
2047-07
2047-07
2047 in science